A huang (璜) is a Chinese arc-shaped jade artifact that was used as a pendant. 

Huang arcs were used in a jade pei ornament set (組玉佩), which would be worn from the belt. The pendant set would emit a faint pleasant sound as the wearer walked, in line with the customs of Confucian etiquette. The number of huang arcs in a set of jade pendants is not always the same. It is suggested that the amount in a set may have indicated the social status of the person.  

At the ends of a huang, there were often abstract heads of animals carved into the jade. During the Eastern Zhou period, block-shaped tiger-like ends were often used in the huang, but these would develop into more-abstract notches.

See also

Bi (jade)

References

Jade
Hardstone carving
Chinese art